Stigmatodon is a genus of plants in the family Bromeliaceae.

Species
Species include:
 Stigmatodon amadoi (Leme) Leme, G.K.Br. & Barfuss
 Stigmatodon apparicianus (E.Pereira & Reitz) Leme, G.K.Br. & Barfuss
 Stigmatodon belloi (Leme) Leme, G.K.Br. & Barfuss
 Stigmatodon bifidus (Leme & L.Kollmann) Leme, G.K.Br. & Barfuss
 Stigmatodon brassicoides (Baker) Leme, G.K.Br. & Barfuss
 Stigmatodon costae (B.R.Silva & Leme) Leme, G.K.Br. & Barfuss
 Stigmatodon croceanus (Leme & G.K.Br.) Leme, G.K.Br. & Barfuss
 Stigmatodon euclidianus (Leme & G.K.Br.) Leme, G.K.Br. & Barfuss
 Stigmatodon fontellanus (Leme & G.K.Br.) Leme, G.K.Br. & Barfuss
 Stigmatodon funebris (L.B.Sm.) Leme, G.K.Br. & Barfuss
 Stigmatodon gastinianus (Leme & G.K.Br.) Leme, G.K.Br. & Barfuss
 Stigmatodon goniorachis (Baker) Leme, G.K.Br. & Barfuss
 Stigmatodon harrylutheri (Leme & G.K.Br.) Leme, G.K.Br. & Barfuss
 Stigmatodon magnibracteatus (Leme & L.Kollmann) Leme, G.K.Br. & Barfuss
 Stigmatodon multifoliatus (Leme & G.K.Br.) Leme, G.K.Br. & Barfuss
 Stigmatodon plurifolius (Leme) Leme, G.K.Br. & Barfuss
 Stigmatodon rosulatulus (Leme) Leme, G.K.Br. & Barfuss
 Stigmatodon sanctateresensis (Leme & L.Kollmann) Leme, G.K.Br. & Barfuss

References

 
Bromeliaceae genera
Epiphytes